Oguni-numa Pond (Japanese Kanji: 雄国沼; Japanese Hiragana: おぐにぬま) is a pond located at the western base of Mount Nekomadake in Fukushima Prefecture, Japan. The pond is situated on the remains of a crater and has a circumference of 4 km and an area of 45 hectares. It is considered a national monument.

Tourist attractions in Fukushima Prefecture
Landforms of Fukushima Prefecture
Ponds of Japan
Bodies of water of Japan